Y road may refer to :
 Y junction (disambiguation)
 interchange on the Greek Attiki Odos highway